Forever Love Song is a 1998 ATV drama series produced in Hong Kong.  The story behind the main character Monica Mui is loosely based on that of Anita Mui.  Names were changed and fictional elements were added.

Synopsis
The story is based on the music career of a singer named Monica Mui who started out by winning a singing competition.  Soon Mui would be recognized as one of the best singers by fans and rise to the top of the industry.  But the competing record companies would do anything to make sure she failed.  Eventually both Mui and her manager would experience difficult hardships with family, work and other romance issues.

Cast

See also
 Song Bird

References

Asia Television original programming
1998 Hong Kong television series debuts